Dirty John is a true crime podcast based on the life of John Michael Meehan. The podcast is hosted by Christopher Goffard and was created by Wondery and the Los Angeles Times. The first two chapters were launched on October 2, 2017; the following four chapters were released over the following days. The podcast was downloaded over 10 million times within six weeks of release.

Title
The title Dirty John is one of the nicknames John Meehan's classmates gave him during his time at the University of Dayton. Other nicknames from this time included "Filthy John" and "Filthy". The exact origin of these nicknames is never divulged during the podcast.

Synopsis
Dirty John is a true crime story focusing on the life and exploits of John Meehan. Los Angeles Times journalist Christopher Goffard first heard of Meehan when he learned that the police were investigating a possible murder in Newport Beach. Upon investigating, Goffard discovered a bizarre web of deceit and abuse.

The main focus of the story is Meehan's relationship with businesswoman Debra Newell, whom he met via an Internet dating site and married within months, as well as her immediate and extended family. The podcast deals with themes of abuse and manipulation, as well as the behaviors of those being abused.

Meehan was killed by Newell's younger daughter, Terra, who acted in self-defense when he tried to abduct her on the rooftop parking lot of her apartment building on August 20, 2016. He was hospitalized and died on August 24. The story was covered by Dateline NBC on January 12, 2018 and included interviews with Goffard.

Individuals involved
 Christopher Goffard – the host, a Pulitzer Prize-nominated journalist
 John Meehan – the titular "Dirty John"
 Debra Newell – a successful businesswoman looking for love online
 Jacquelyn Newell – Debra's older daughter
 Terra Newell – Debra's younger daughter
 Cash – Terra's dog, a miniature Australian Shepherd
 Shad Vickers – Debra's nephew, the son of her late sister Cindi
 John Dzialo – Attorney
 Tonia Sells – John's first wife

Episodes

Reception
Dirty John proved to be very popular with audiences, and spent over three weeks at the top of the US iTunes podcast charts, whilst also topping the charts in Australia, Canada, and the UK and was downloaded over five million times in three weeks. It was downloaded over 10 million times within six weeks of release, and as of November 23, 2017, is the sixth most downloaded podcasts on iTunes America.

Critical reception was also positive, with the NME calling it "the best true crime podcast since Serial", while The Guardian listed Dirty John as their podcast pick of the week. Dirty John also received positive reviews from Mashable, The New Yorker, Rolling Stone and The Daily Telegraph amongst others.

Vulture.com, meanwhile, praised the story as "stunning" but questioned the necessity of using a podcast as a way to share the story.

TV adaptation

A limited series based on the podcast debuted on Bravo on November 25, 2018. It was created, produced, and written by Alexandra Cunningham, and stars Connie Britton and Eric Bana.

See also 
 List of American crime podcasts

References

External links

Investigative journalism
Infotainment
Audio podcasts
2017 podcast debuts
Mass media in Los Angeles
Crime in California
Crime podcasts
2017 podcast endings
Podcasts adapted into television shows